"Over" is Fayray's 10th single and first on new record label, avex trax. It was released on October 11, 2001 and peaked at #18. The song was used in a commercial for Kanebo's "KATE spicy eyes" cosmetics line and also served as ending theme for the TV Tokyo program "Lon-Mu London Ongakukan". The coupling is a cover of Divinyls's "I Touch Myself".

Track listing
Over
I Touch Myself

Charts 
"Over" - Oricon Sales Chart (Japan)

External links
FAYRAY OFFICIAL SITE

2001 singles
Fayray songs
2001 songs
Avex Trax singles
Songs written by Fayray